Porta Nuova (literally "New Gate") is one of the main business districts of Milan, Italy in terms of economy, and part of the Zone 2 administrative division. Named after the well-preserved Neoclassic gate built in 1810 on this site, it is now one of Italy's most high-tech and international districts, containing the country's tallest skyscraper: the Unicredit Tower

Porta Nuova has a 2017 city GDP of €400 billion, which makes it Europe's richest district within any city. A concentration of companies are based in Porta Nuova, with 4% of all institutions and conglomerates found in Italy, while Milan has 40% of all these business, and Milan's Lombardy Region has 53% of it.

Industrialization is also profusely increasing within the district. A total of three Fortune 500 companies are located in it, namely AlfaRomeo, Pirelli and Techint, with a lot of other significant companies, including luxury fashion house Versace and italian football giants Internazionale. Geographical Porta Nuova was the main engine of the global invention of "polypropylene" by Giulio Natta, or in other terms, plastic, popularized by several companies within the city during the 1950s. Porta Nuova began manufacturing trams, buses, and trains, as part of Milan's public transport system which now gave Milan Europe's most advanced light rail system.

In 2019, Milan is in course to have several tax-free or flat tax services, as part of attracting domestic and international businesses which will be initiated in the area of Porta Nuova. It is also an integrated response to gain several European Union agencies from United Kingdom following Brexit and to prevent a possible economic fallout.

History

Porta Nuova is named after the Napoleonic gate which was erected in 1810 from a design by Giuseppe Zanoia.

In the 1990s Milan, a former heavy-industry powerhouse, was filled with about 6 million square metres of industrial wastelands and unused railroad tracks; transforming such places following the example set by London and other post-industrial cities had become a primary objective for the municipal administration.

The Porta Nuova business district project was born in 1997 in collaboration with American real estate developer Gerald D. Hines and his partners, Micheal Topham and Riccardo Catella; the new district took fourteen years to develop and has been built on a large area of central Milan affected by decades of urban decay, after a series of failed development plans in the 1970s.

The 290,000 square metres (later increased to 346,500), US$2.5bn mixed use project was definitively approved in 2005 and was designed by three masterplanners, Pelli Clarke Pelli, Boeri Studio and Kohn Pedersen Fox.

In 2013 Qatar Holding LLC, a unit of the Persian Gulf emirate's sovereign wealth fund, agreed to buy a 40 percent stake in Milan's newly built Porta Nuova business district to expand its Italian real estate holdings. In 2015 Qatar Investment Authority agreed to buy the 60 percent of Porta Nuova it did not already own.

At the end of 2017 construction works began for "Gioia 22", a new 26-story, 120 metres high tower designed by architect Gregg E. Jones of Pelli Clarke Pelli and scheduled to be completed by 2020.

Area specifications 

Pelli Clarke Pelli designed the largest part of the development, the "Garibaldi" area (near Garibaldi railway station), with office and retail compounds extending over 230,500 square metres. It is centered on the Unicredit Tower complex, that features three office towers, of which the largest, a 31-story, 231 metres high asymmetrical tower culminating in a sculptural, 80m stainless steel spire, is currently (as of 2017) the tallest building in Italy.

The "Varesine" area, named after a now demolished railway station that once connected Milan to Varese, has been designed by Kohn Pedersen Fox Associated and occupies 85,000 square metres. The main building of this area is Torre Diamante, a 130 mentres high, diamond-shaped tower that is Italy's tallest skyscraper with a steel structure.

The "Isola" area ("island" in Italian, owing its name to the fact that it was once encircled by railway lines), designed by Boeri Studio, extends over 31,500 square metres. Its most distinctive feature is Bosco Verticale, a pair of residential towers covered in trees and vegetation.

Buildings

Towers and other buildings

Luxury residences

Other buildings

See also
 Tallest buildings in Italy

References

Districts of Milan
Neoclassical architecture in Milan